Axel Erland Sjöblad (born 3 November 1967) is a Swedish handball player who competed in the 1992 Summer Olympics.

He was born in Malmö.

In 1992 he was a member of the Swedish handball team which won the silver medal. He played all seven matches and scored five goals.

References

1967 births
Living people
Swedish male handball players
Olympic handball players of Sweden
Handball players at the 1992 Summer Olympics
Olympic silver medalists for Sweden
Olympic medalists in handball
Medalists at the 1992 Summer Olympics
Sportspeople from Malmö
20th-century Swedish people